Pherothrinax bistellata is a species of tephritid or fruit flies in the genus Pherothrinax of the family Tephritidae.

Distribution
Tanzania.

References

Tephritinae
Insects described in 1924
Taxa named by Mario Bezzi
Diptera of Africa